"Rusted from the Rain" is the first official single by the great Canadian rock band Billy Talent off their album Billy Talent III. It was released on May 19, 2009.
Lead singer Ben Kowalewicz has said that the song is very "tin man-esque" and evolved from an "epic Soundgarden-like riff". The lyrics are about marital breakdown, Kowalewicz told Kerrang!: "Nowadays, I'm seeing a lot of people who got married young are now getting divorced. It seems to be a new fad. Divorce is the new black." The song was nominated for Single of the Year at the 2010 Juno Awards, but lost to Michael Bublé's "Haven't Met You Yet".

The band's cover of John Lennon's classic song "Cold Turkey", was released on the CD single, on June 30, 2009.

Track listing

CD single 
 "Rusted from the Rain" – 4:14
 "Cold Turkey" (John Lennon cover) – 3:08

Maxi CD 
 "Rusted from the Rain" – 4:14
 "Cold Turkey" (John Lennon cover) – 3:08
 "Red Flag" (live at the Horseshoe Tavern) – 3:50
 "Rusted from the Rain" (music video) – 4:14

US digital EP 
 "Rusted from the Rain" – 4:13
 "Devil on My Shoulder" – 3:48
 "Cold Turkey" (John Lennon cover) – 3:08
 "Red Flag" (live at the Horseshoe Tavern) – 3:16

Music video 
The video was shot in April 2009 by director Wayne Isham in Los Angeles. The video pans between the band playing in a junkyard and a vagrant collecting junk and garbage in the streets. As the video progresses, it is revealed that the man collected the trash to construct a makeshift carousel for a small group of children in the neighbourhood.

Charts

Year-end charts

References 

2009 singles
Billy Talent songs
Music videos directed by Wayne Isham
Song recordings produced by Brendan O'Brien (record producer)
Songs written by Ian D'Sa
Songs written by Benjamin Kowalewicz
Rock ballads
2009 songs